Barrie Horace Mitchell (15 March 1947 – 24 January 2021) was a Scottish footballer who played as a forward for Dunfermline Athletic, Aberdeen, Tranmere Rovers, Vancouver Whitecaps, Preston North End, York City, Greenock Morton and Wigan Athletic.

Mitchell was a member of the Dunfermline squad that won the Scottish Cup in 1968.

In March 1978, he joined Wigan Athletic, making 10 league appearances for the club in the Northern Premier League.

Like many other footballers of his era, Mitchell became a publican after retiring from football.

References

1947 births
2021 deaths
Footballers from Aberdeen
Association football forwards
Scottish footballers
Arbroath F.C. players
Dunfermline Athletic F.C. players
Aberdeen F.C. players
Tranmere Rovers F.C. players
Vancouver Whitecaps (1974–1984) players
Preston North End F.C. players
York City F.C. players
Greenock Morton F.C. players
Wigan Athletic F.C. players
Scottish Football League players
English Football League players
Scottish expatriate footballers
Expatriate soccer players in Canada
British publicans
North American Soccer League (1968–1984) players
Scottish expatriate sportspeople in Canada